The Honolulu Zoo is a  zoo in Queen Kapiʻolani Park in Honolulu, Hawaii. It is the only zoo in the United States to be established by grants made by a sovereign monarch and is built on part of the  royal Queen Kapiʻolani Park. The Honolulu Zoo features over 1,230 animals in specially designed habitats.

Over 601,510 people visit the zoo annually. The zoo is administered by the City & County of Honolulu through the Department of Enterprise Services. Its support agency, the Honolulu Zoo Society (HZS), provides program services for the zoo.

The zoo's accredited membership of the Association of Zoos and Aquariums (AZA) was dropped in 2016 but reinstated in 2020.

Queen Kapi‘olani Park
In 1876, King Kalākaua made royal lands near the slopes of Lē‘ahi available for the establishment of a grand public park for the people of his kingdom. Two hundred subscribers to the king's project formed the Kapiʻolani Park Association for the purpose of pursuing the mission. In 1877, the marshes, ponds and lagoons in the area were beautified, and it was opened as Queen Kapiʻolani Park in honor of Queen Kapiʻolani, wife of Kalākaua.

Even as a public park, King Kalākaua continued using the park as a place for his personal collection of exotic birds and horses. The park brought more exotic animals as it staged the Kamehameha Day celebrations and various carnivals and fairs. In 1896, the City & County of Honolulu assumed control of Queen Kapiʻolani Park.

History

In 1914, the City & County of Honolulu appointed Ben Hollinger to be its Administrator of Parks and Recreation, and Queen Kapiʻolani Park came under his control. Hollinger maintained a fascination with animals and began collecting them to showcase at the park in Waikīkī. The park became home for a monkey, a sun bear and several lion cubs. In 1916, a steamship on its way from Australia to Canada pulled into port at Honolulu Harbor. On board was an African elephant named Daisy. Hollinger pleaded with the City & County of Honolulu to purchase the elephant, which they did. With the acquisition of the elephant, from live animal trader Ellis S. Joseph, Honolulu officially had a zoo. Daisy entertained visitors at the park until 1933, when Daisy was killed by Honolulu Police Department officers after she trampled her trainer, George Conradt, to death.

During the Great Depression, the Honolulu Zoo was almost shut down for lack of finances. Even through the difficulty, it expanded its collection on November 29, 1949, with the purchase of an elephant, a Bactrian camel, sea lions, several bird species, spider monkeys and a tortoise. The Honolulu Zoo continued to operate in disrepair.

In 1974, the Honolulu Zoo accepted a donation of a camel, an elephant, chimpanzees and deer. These donations renewed Honolulu's enthusiasm to revive their zoo. The City & County of Honolulu approved a master plan that determined the boundaries of the present  site at the north end of Queen Kapiʻolani Park. The animal collection, increased by purchase, trade and donations, was housed in newly constructed facilities, some of which still provide foundations for newer exhibits. The facility designs were influenced by the exhibits of the San Diego Zoo in California.

The Honolulu Zoo experienced another revival of enthusiasm in the 1990s as the exhibits were redesigned to feature more natural settings for the animals on display.

Gallery

Art
Art at the Honolulu Zoo includes: 
 Giraffe, a 1959 metal sculpture by Charles W. Watson 
 Ostrich, a 1960 metal sculpture by Charles W. Watson no longer exists.
 Hawaiian Porpoises, a 1976 metal, fiberglass, and coral sculpture by Ken Shutt
 Hippopotami, a 1976 chicken wire, cloth, and Belzona resin sculpture by Jack Throp
 Elephant's Child, a 1988 bronze sculpture by Tom Tischler
 Gecko's Delight, a 1978 wood relief sculpture by John Nippolt
 Hawaiian Pigs, a 1976 stone sculpture by Gregory Clurman
 Giraffe, a 1998 fiberglass sculpture by Jim de la Torre
 Whooping Cranes, a pair of 1998 metal sculptures by Paul Saviskas
 Maasai Tribesman, a 1999 metal sculpture by Paul Saviskas
 The Evolution of an Island, a 1991 metal mural by Amanda Opsahl

References

External links

 

Education in Honolulu
Zoos in Hawaii
Tourist attractions in Honolulu
Research institutes in Hawaii
Biological research institutes in the United States
Buildings and structures in Honolulu
1916 establishments in Hawaii
Zoos established in 1916